Dinas Powys railway station is one of two railway stations serving the village of Dinas Powys in the Vale of Glamorgan, South Wales. It is located on Network Rail's Barry Branch 4½ miles (7 km) south of Cardiff Central towards Barry Island and Bridgend (via Barry and Rhoose).

As of October 2018, passenger services are operated by Transport for Wales as part of the Valley Lines network.

Services
Monday to Saturday daytimes there is a 15-minute frequency northbound to Cardiff Central and beyond (to either  or ). Southbound 3 trains per hour to Barry Island and an hourly service to Bridgend via Rhoose.

Evenings and Sundays there is a generally a half-hourly service to Cardiff Central. Evenings there is an hourly service southbound to Barry Island and Bridgend whilst on Sundays half-hourly to Barry Island and every two hours to Bridgend.

References

External links

Railway stations in the Vale of Glamorgan
DfT Category F2 stations
Former Barry Railway stations
Railway stations served by Transport for Wales Rail
Railway stations in Great Britain opened in 1888